"The Age of the Understatement" is the first single released by The Last Shadow Puppets. It was released on 14 April 2008 in the United Kingdom on Domino Records. The song is the title track from the band's debut album The Age of the Understatement.

Music video
The video was shot in Moscow, Russia by French director Romain Gavras, and features Turner and Kane walking through the Russian capital. Gavras would later describe the shoot as "crazy" saying: "On the other side of the camera, it was a training camp with tanks shooting all the time, totally unsafe." The video won Best Cinematography at the 2008 UK Music Video Awards.

Track listing

Charts

References

2008 debut singles
2008 songs
The Last Shadow Puppets songs
Songs written by Alex Turner (musician)
Song recordings produced by James Ford (musician)
Music videos directed by Romain Gavras
Songs written by Miles Kane
Domino Recording Company singles